This page provides the summary of RBBC1 Middle East Africa Qualifier/Finals. 

Since 2012, Red Bull BC One has held a qualifier for the World Final in the Middle East Africa Region. The winner advances to the Red Bull BC One World Final.

Winners

2015

RBBC1 Middle East Africa 2015 results
Location:  Cairo, Egypt

2014

RBBC1 Middle East Africa 2014 results
Location:  Algiers, Algeria

2013

RBBC1 Middle East Africa 2013 results
Location: Amman, Jordan

2012

RBBC1 Middle East Africa 2012 results
Location:  Marrakesh, Morocco

External links
 RBBC1 Middle East Africa 2013

Red Bull BC One